Maria Amalia of Austria (Maria Amalie Josefa Anna; 22 October 1701 – 11 December 1756) was Holy Roman Empress, Queen of the Germans, Queen of Bohemia, Electress and Duchess of Bavaria etc. as the spouse of Emperor Charles VII. By birth, she was an archduchess of Austria, the daughter of Emperor Joseph I and Wilhelmine Amalia of Brunswick-Lüneburg. Maria Amalia had seven children, only four of whom lived through to adulthood, including Maximilian III, Elector of Bavaria.

Biography

Early life
Maria Amalia was born an Austrian archduchess in Hofburg Palace, Vienna; about eleven weeks after the death of her infant brother Leopold Joseph, her parents' only son. Her mother, Empress Wilhelmine Amalia, was unable to conceive more children after Maria Amalia, supposedly because her father, Emperor Joseph I, had contracted syphilis from one of his mistresses and passed the disease to his wife, rendering the Empress infertile. Maria Amalia's father had a long line of mistresses, both servants and nobles, and several illegitimate children.

When Maria Amalia was nine-years-old, her father died of smallpox and was succeeded by his brother Emperor Charles VI. Charles ignored a decree signed during the reign of his and Joseph's father, Emperor Leopold I, that gave Maria Amalia and her sister Maria Josepha precedence in succession as the daughters of Leopold's eldest son. Instead, he promulgated the Pragmatic Sanction of 1713, which replaced Maria Amalia and Maria Josepha with his own daughter Maria Theresa in the line of succession. The displaced archduchesses were not allowed to marry until they renounced their rights to the Austrian succession.

Marriage

Maria Amalia was proposed as a bride for the Italian Victor Amadeus, Prince of Piedmont, heir to the Kingdom of Sicily and Duchy of Savoy. The union was supposed to create better relations between Savoy and Austria, but the plan was ignored by the Duke of Savoy. The younger Victor Amadeus subsequently died of smallpox, unmarried, in 1715.

In 1717, Maria Amalia met her future spouse, Charles Albert of Bavaria, when he visited Vienna on his way to participate in the war against the Ottoman Empire in Belgrade. He used the time to become acquainted with the Imperial family, and wished to marry into the Habsburg dynasty for dynastic and economic reasons. They met a second time in 1718. However, Charles Albert initially asked to marry her elder sister Maria Josepha, but she was already engaged at the time of his proposal. Maria Amalia and her sister Maria Josepha were both given a very strict Catholic upbringing with focus on Catholic religious duties by their mother, but Maria Amalia was described as having a more vivid and extrovert personality than the more serious Maria Josepha.

Having agreed to recognize the Pragmatic Sanction, Maria Amalia married Prince-Elector Charles Albert of Bavaria on 5 October 1722 in Vienna. The opera I veri amici ("The True Friends") by Tomaso Albinoni was performed at the wedding. Maria Amalia received a grand dowry, including jewelry worth 986.500 gulden, but outside the religious festivities, the wedding was not celebrated as much in Vienna as it would be in Munich, where festivities lasted from 17 October to 4 November.

They lived at Nymphenburg Palace in Munich and had seven children. In May 1727, at the birth of the heir, Maximilian III Joseph, Maria Amalia was given her own residence, the Fürstenried Palace as a puerperal gift; and in 1734, Charles Albert named the Amalienburg in the Nymphenburg Palace Park after her. Similar to her mother, she was forced to accept the infidelity of her spouse: her husband also had six illegitimate children. However, their relationship is described as a moderately happy one, as they had similar personalities and interests. Like Charles Albert, she enjoyed court life, pomp and parties, and together they made the Bavarian court a cultural center. Maria Amalia was interested in politics, had a passion for hunting, and managed to engage also in her interest for travels with the argument that pilgrimages would make it easier for her to give birth to sons. She protected churches and convents and had a close relationship with her sister-in-law Maria Anna, who was a member of the Poor Clares in Munich. She liked the opera and her apartments at the royal Munich residence is regarded as a notable example of the Rococo.

Despite the fact that Maria Amalia had renounced her claims to the Austrian lands upon her marriage, Charles Albert claimed the Habsburg lands by marriage to her during the War of the Austrian Succession in 1740. After an agreement with the spouse of her elder sister Maria Josepha, who would otherwise have a stronger claim than her, her husband invaded Bohemia. Maria Amalia was crowned as Queen of Bohemia in Prague on 7 December 1741. On 12 February 1742, Maria Amalia became Holy Roman Empress following Charles Albert's coronation as Holy Roman Emperor in Frankfurt, where she herself was crowned as Empress Consort. However on 14 February 1742, Bavaria was occupied by Austria.

Death

Maria Amalia's husband died on 20 January 1745 and was buried at the Theatine Church in Munich. On his death, she persuaded her son Maximilian to make peace with her cousin Maria Theresa. As a widow, she mainly resided at Fuerstenried Palace. In 1754, Maria Amalia founded a medical hospital, managed by the nuns of the Elisabetinerinnen, whom she invited to Munich. This is counted as the first modern hospital in the city.

Maria Amalia died in Munich at the Nymphenburg Palace on 11 December 1756, aged 55.

The following anecdote is from the fifth volume of Casanova's History of My Life:

The confessor, who was a Jesuit, received me as badly as possible. He said in passing that my reputation was well known in Munich. I asked him firmly if he was telling me this as good news or bad, and he did not answer. He simply walked away, and a priest told me that he had gone to verify a miracle of which all Munich was talking. "The Empress," he said, "the widow of Charles VII, whose body is still exposed to public view, has warm feet though she is dead." He said that I could go and see the wonder for myself. Most eager to be able to boast at last that I had witnessed a miracle, and one which was of the greatest interest to me since my feet were always icy, I go to see the illustrious corpse, which did indeed have warm feet, but it was because of a hot stove which stood very near her defunct Imperial Majesty.

Issue

Ancestry

References

 Johann Jakob Moser: Geschichte und Thaten des Kaysers Carl des Siebenden unpartheyisch beschrieben und mit Anmerckungen erläutert, 1745
 Constantin von Wurzbach: Habsburg, Maria Amalia (deutsche Kaiserin). In: Biographisches Lexikon des Kaiserthums Oesterreich. Vol. 6, Verlag L. C. Zamarski, Wien 1860, p. 22.
 Peter Claus Hartmann: Karl Albrecht – Karl VII., 1985, 
 Gerhard Hojer: Die Amalienburg, 1986, 
 Alois Schmid: Maria Amalia, Erzherzogin von Österreich. In: Neue Deutsche Biographie (NDB). Vol. 16, Duncker & Humblot, Berlin 1990, p. 175 f. (Digitalisat).
 Rudolf Reiser: Karl VII., 2002, 
 Andrea Rueth: Maria Amalia. In: Jürgen Wurst, Alexander Langheiter (Hrsg.): Monachia. Städtische Galerie im Lenbachhaus, München 2005, p. 146.

External links

1701 births
1756 deaths
18th-century House of Habsburg
18th-century Austrian women
Austrian people of the War of the Austrian Succession
Holy Roman Empresses
German queens consort
Bohemian queens consort
Nobility from Vienna
Austrian princesses
Electresses of Bavaria
Electoral Princesses of Bavaria
Burials at the Theatine Church, Munich
18th-century women of the Holy Roman Empire
Daughters of emperors
Daughters of kings